The 16th General Assembly of Prince Edward Island represented the colony of Prince Edward Island between January 23, 1843, and 1847.

The Assembly sat at the pleasure of the Governor of Prince Edward Island, Henry Vere Huntley.  Joseph Pope was elected speaker.

Members

The members of the Prince Edward Island Legislature after the general election of 1843 were:

External links 
 Journal of the House of Assembly of Prince Edward Island (1843)

Terms of the General Assembly of Prince Edward Island
1843 establishments in Prince Edward Island
1847 disestablishments in Prince Edward Island